Ong Pang Boon  (born 28 March 1929) is a Singaporean retired politician who served as Minister for Home Affairs between 1959 and 1963 and again for a short period of time in 1970, Minister for Education between 1963 and 1970, Minister for Labour between 1971 and 1981, and Minister for the Environment between 1981 and 1985.

Early life and education
Born in Kuala Lumpur, Ong attended the Methodist Boys' School in Kuala Lumpur before enrolling into the University of Malaya at Singapore campus (now the National University of Singapore), where he studied geography.

Political career
In 1955, Ong's foray into politics began as a polling agent for Lee Kuan Yew in the 1955 legislative assembly election.

In 1956, Lee Kuan Yew wrote to Ong and offered him a job as party organising secretary for the PAP.

He stood for election in the 21 December 1957 for the fully elected City Council of Singapore as a candidate for the Tanjong Pagar ward and was successfully returned and became the first and only ever Deputy Mayor. He held the post until he resigned in April 1959 to contest the Legislative Assembly election as the PAP's candidate for Telok Ayer. This was to be the first Legislative Assembly in which all seats were elected. He won the seat, which he retained till his retirement in 1984. He was subsequently appointed as Minister for Home Affairs in the first self-government Cabinet and played a key role to eradicating yellow culture and crime in Singapore society. His cabinet appointment also made him part of the Internal Security Council which sanctioned Operation Coldstore in 1963.

From 1963 to 1970, Ong took on the highly sensitive Education ministerial portfolio at a time when Chinese language culture and education issues were highly politicized.  By increasing the teaching of English in Chinese schools and vice versa, he was instrumental in laying the foundation for the bilingual policy for which Singapore is famous.

In 1970, Ong became the Labour Minister.

In 1980, he took over as the Environment Minister.

In 1984, he stepped down from the Cabinet to make way for younger leaders. However, he displayed some unhappiness at the pace and manner by which he was sidelined from the political scene. He retired from politics in 1988 when his constituency of Telok Ayer was eliminated in the 22 December 1984 general election. Lee recognised Ong's displeasure in a public letter of appreciation:

 “... I agree with you. You also had misgivings (about some newcomers), as had the late Dr Toh Chin Chye, over the speed of self-renewal and the effect it was having on the morale of the old guard MPs.”

Ong is considered as one of the 'Old Guard' - the first generation of leaders of independent Singapore. He is the sole remaining living member, after Jek Yeun Thong's passing in June 2018.

Philanthropic work 
Ong continued to serve the society through his involvement in the community. Ong, who previously served as the vice-chairman of Singapore Hokkien Huay Kuan in the 2000s, is currently serving in the Board of Governors of the association.

References

Bibliography
 Lam, Peng Er and Tan, Kevin (Ed.) (2000). Lee's lieutenants : Singapore's old guard. Singapore: Allen & Unwin. 

Members of the Parliament of Singapore
Members of the Dewan Rakyat
Members of the Legislative Assembly of Singapore
People's Action Party politicians
Singaporean people of Hokkien descent
Malaysian emigrants to Singapore
People who lost Malaysian citizenship
Naturalised citizens of Singapore
University of Malaya alumni
1929 births
Living people
Recipients of the Darjah Utama Nila Utama
Environment ministers of Singapore
Ministers for Education of Singapore
Ministers for Home Affairs of Singapore
Ministers for Labour of Singapore
Badminton executives and administrators